Zeni Husmani (born 28 November 1990) is a Macedonian footballer who plays for Domžale as a midfielder.

Biography

Husmani was born in Čegrane (present day North Macedonia) and moved to Croatia after his father accepted a job in Knin when Husmani was seven years old, together with his mother, brother and sister.

Notes

References

External links
Player profile at NZS 

1990 births
Living people
People from Gostivar Municipality
Albanian footballers from North Macedonia
Macedonian footballers
Association football midfielders
Macedonian expatriate footballers
North Macedonia under-21 international footballers
HNK Šibenik players
NK Domžale players
Giresunspor footballers
KF Shkëndija players
Croatian Football League players
Slovenian PrvaLiga players
Süper Lig players
Macedonian First Football League players
Expatriate footballers in Croatia
Macedonian expatriate sportspeople in Croatia
Expatriate footballers in Slovenia
Macedonian expatriate sportspeople in Slovenia
Expatriate footballers in Turkey
Macedonian expatriate sportspeople in Turkey